Alexander Kitarov (born June 18, 1987) is a Belarusian professional ice hockey player who is currently playing for Yunost Minsk in the Belarusian Hockey League (BXL).

He participated in the 2011 IIHF World Championship as a member of the Belarus men's national ice hockey team.

External links

1987 births
Belarusian ice hockey forwards
HC Dinamo Minsk players
HC Kunlun Red Star players
Living people
HC Neftekhimik Nizhnekamsk players
Yunost Minsk players
People from Navapolatsk
Universiade medalists in ice hockey
Universiade silver medalists for Belarus
Competitors at the 2011 Winter Universiade
People from Polatsk District
Sportspeople from Vitebsk Region